Burtsevo is a rural locality (a village) in Styopantsevskoye Rural Settlement, Vyaznikovsky District, Vladimir Oblast, Russia. The population was 11 as of 2010.

Geography 
Burtsevo is located 38 km southwest of Vyazniki (the district's administrative centre) by road. Nevezhino is the nearest rural locality.

References 

Rural localities in Vyaznikovsky District